Sam Shing is an MTR Light Rail terminus located on the ground near Hoi Wing Road, inside Hanford Garden and next to Sam Shing Estate in Tuen Mun District, Hong Kong. It began service on 2 February 1992 and belongs to Zone 1. It serves Sam Shing Estate and Hanford Garden.

There are three platforms in the terminus. Platform 1 is the terminus of route 505. Platform 2 is reserved for emergency use. Platform 3 is for alighting.

The stop was named Sam Shing Terminus before 13 June 2010.

Reserved area
Besides the current Route 505, there were other two branch lines planned for the terminus, departing to Chi Lok Fa Yuen and Hong Kong Gold Coast in Tuen Mun respectively. But the plan was later left out by British Hong Kong Government due to insufficient population in the two places in the 1990s. As a result, there are still some vacant areas left in the terminus after the terminus completed construction.

References

MTR Light Rail stops
Former Kowloon–Canton Railway stations
Tuen Mun District
Railway stations in Hong Kong opened in 1992
MTR Light Rail stops named from housing estates
1992 establishments in Hong Kong